The Jimmy Wheeler Show is the name of two different television series which starred English comedian Jimmy Wheeler.

The first was a British series which aired 1956–57. Little is known about this series, which is believed to have been wiped.

The second was an Australian television series which aired on ABC during 1960. It was a 30-minute variety series. In one episode, the cast included singer Wheeler, Peggy Mortimer, juggler Lloyd Nairn, Stuart Finch, the Beryl Ellis Dancers and the Musical Troubadours. Archival status of this version is not known.

References

External links
Australian series on IMDb

1956 British television series debuts
1957 British television series endings
1950s British television series
English-language television shows
British live television series
Lost television shows
Black-and-white British television shows
British variety television shows
Black-and-white Australian television shows
Australian variety television shows
Australian Broadcasting Corporation original programming
1960 Australian television series debuts
1960 Australian television series endings